Howden was a rural district in the East Riding of Yorkshire, England from 1894 to 1974.
  
It was formed under the Local Government Act 1894 as a successor to the Howden rural sanitary district.   It lost a few parishes to the newly created Derwent Rural District and parts to Beverley Rural District in 1935 by a County Review Order made under the Local Government Act 1929. At the same time it gained a small part from the abolition of Riccal Rural District. 

It survived until 1974 when it was abolished, becoming part of the Boothferry district of Humberside.  Since 1996 it has formed part of the unitary authority of the East Riding of Yorkshire.

References

External links

Districts of England created by the Local Government Act 1894
Rural districts of the East Riding of Yorkshire
Districts of England abolished by the Local Government Act 1972